Jörg Huffschmid (19 February 1940 – 5 December 2009) was a German economist. He held a chair at the University of Bremen.

Born in Cologne, Huffschmid attended the University of Freiburg, University of Paris, and Free University of Berlin, majoring in philosophy and economics. He earned his Diplom in 1963, and his Ph.D. in 1967.

External links
 Website at the University of Bremen 
 Obituary 
 In memoriam de Jörg Huffschmid, economista, 2010. Miren Etxezarreta Revista de Economía Crítica nr. 9.  (pdf) 

1940 births
2009 deaths
German economists
Free University of Berlin alumni
Academic staff of the University of Bremen
Writers from Cologne